Grant Gillis (January 24, 1901 – February 4, 1981) was a utility infielder in Major League Baseball who played from 1927 through 1929 for the Washington Senators (1927–28) and Boston Red Sox (1929). A native of Grove Hill, Alabama, he was signed by Washington out of the University of Alabama. At Alabama he was the first quarterback under Wallace Wade.  
 
In a three-season career, Gillis was a .245 hitter (48-for-196) with 10 RBI and 26 runs in 62 games, including 12 doubles and two triples. He did not hit a home run. As an infielder, he made 59 appearances at second base (30), shortstop (26) and third base (3).

Gillis died in Thomasville, Alabama, at age 80.

Trivia
In a five-for-one trade, Gillis was dealt by the Senators to Boston along with Elliot Bigelow, Milt Gaston, Hod Lisenbee and Bobby Reeves, in the transaction that brought Buddy Myer to Washington on December 15, 1928.

References

External links

1901 births
1981 deaths
Alabama Crimson Tide football players
Baseball players from Alabama
Birmingham Barons players
Boston Red Sox players
Charlotte Hornets (baseball) players
Columbus Senators players
Jersey City Skeeters players
Major League Baseball infielders
Memphis Chickasaws players
Minneapolis Millers (baseball) players
Minor league baseball managers
University of Alabama alumni
Washington Senators (1901–1960) players
People from Grove Hill, Alabama
People from Thomasville, Alabama
All-Southern college football players